Farman Nunatak is a nunatak,  high, rising west of Mount Morton in Bleriot Glacier, on the west coast of Graham Land. It was photographed by the Falkland Islands and Dependencies Aerial Survey Expedition in 1956–57, and mapped from these photos by the Falkland Islands Dependencies Survey. It was named by the UK Antarctic Place-Names Committee in 1960 for Henry Farman, a pioneer Anglo-French aviator and aircraft designer, who carried the first airplane passenger in 1908.

References 

Nunataks of Graham Land
Danco Coast